Karaj Gill is an Indian film producer who makes Punjabi-language films and music. He owns a production house and distribution company Rhythm Boyz Entertainment. Gill began producing films in 2015, with a historical romance film Angrej. He has been nominated for six Filmfare Punjabi Awards, winning two for Bambukat (2016) and Lahoriye (2017), among other accolades.

Career 

Gill co-founded a Canadian production company Rhythm Boyz Entertainment with Amrinder Gill on 19 March 2013. The company was named after their college time Bhangra group of same name. In 2014, a studio album Judaa 2 by Amrinder Gill and Dr Zeus was produced by company. He made his debut as a film producer with Angrej in 2015. Conceived as a romantic comedy set in the pre-partitioned Punjab, the film was directed by Simerjit Singh and was written by Amberdeep Singh, and starred Amrinder Gill, Sargun Mehta, and Aditi Sharma in lead roles. It grossed  in whole theatrical run, making it one of the highest-grossing Punjabi films of all time. Also, the film was critically acclaimed and won ten awards at PTC Punjabi Film Awards including Best Film. Gill in an interview disclosed that their team tries to produce family and meaningful films, and most of the films produced by him are "U" rated in India.

Filmography as producer

References

External links 
 

Living people
Year of birth missing (living people)
Punjabi film producers